Luis Frangella (July 6, 1944 – December 7, 1990) was an Argentinian figurative post-modern painter and sculptor associated with the expressionist painting of the Lower East Side of New York City in the 1980s. He received a Guggenheim Fellowship in 1982. He died of AIDS in 1990.

Education
Frangella earned a Master of Architecture at the Universidad de Buenos Aires in 1972. From 1973 to 1976 he worked as a Research Fellow at the Advanced Visual Studies area of Massachusetts Institute of Technology. He began to paint there.[2]

New York City
Frangella moved to New York City's East Village in 1976, and in the early 1980s he helped organize exhibitions at Limbo, an artists' after-hours club. [3]

Selected exhibitions
2011 LA JARRA VERTIENTE O MÁQUINA DE DIBUJAR, Fundació Suñol, Barcelona, Spain
1990 GROUP OF 16, Museum of Modern Art, Madrid, Spain
1989 DRAWINGS, Fundació Joan Miró, Barcelona, Spain
1988 EXIT ART PERFORMANCE WITH M. AMACHER, Exit Art, New York 
 INAUGURAL EXHIBITION, Buades Gallery, Madrid, Spain
1987 New Jersey Museum, Trenton, New Jersey
1986 Buades Gallery, Madrid, Spain (solo) 
 Eaton-Shoen Gallery, San Francisco, California (solo) 
 Civilian Warfare, New York (solo) 
 PAINTING & SCULPTURE TODAY, Indianapolis Museum of Art, Indiana 
 1985 Hal Bromm Gallery, New York, "New Sculpture" (group)
1985 Hal Bromm Gallery, New York (solo) 
 Civilian Warfare, New York (solo)
1984 Galeria Ciento, Barcelona, Spain (solo) 
 Del Retiro, Buenos Aires, Argentina 
 Bar-Bar, Stockholm Sweden 
 Civilian Warfare, New York
1983 Hal Bromm Gallery, New York (solo)
1982 Alberto Elia, Buenos Aires, Argentina (solo)
1981 Galeria Buades, Madrid, Spain (solo) 
Galeria Ciento, Barcelona, Spain (solo)

Footnotes

Postmodern artists
American contemporary painters
20th-century American painters
American male painters
Painters from New York City
AIDS-related deaths in New York (state)
1944 births
1990 deaths
20th-century American male artists